Yucca constricta known by the common name "Buckley's yucca," is a plant in the family Asparagaceae. It is found in rocky limestone hills of central and eastern Texas, and also in Coahuila, Mexico.

Yucca constricta is usually acaulescent (trunkless), sometimes growing in clumps, spreading by trailing stems. Flowering stalks reach as high as 50 cm (20 inches) with pendent, greenish-white flowers. Fruit is a dry capsule with shiny black seeds.

Yucca constricta is relatively abundant, and although it has local threats, its population appears to be stable overall.

References

constricta
Plants described in 1863
Plants described in 1868
Plants described in 1870
Flora of Coahuila
Flora of Texas